John Oge Burke (Irish: Sean Óge de Búrca; d. June 1601) was an Irish gentleman and soldier, who served during the Nine Years' War, and was executed.

Career
Burke was one of the sons of John Burke, Baron Leitrim (died 1583). He was a participant in the Nine Years' War (Ireland), fighting alongside his brother William Burke, Lord of Bealatury. However he was captured in the first week of 1601.

The Annals of the Four Masters, sub anno 1601, outline John Oge's fate:

After the sons of John Burke had gone to O'Donnell, as we have already stated, they continued, whithersoever they went, in company with O'Donnell, to harass and plunder the Queen's people; for which reason the Lord Justice of Ireland ordered the Earl of Ormond to put to death their brother, John Oge Burke, whom we have mentioned as having been taken prisoner in the first week of this year, in O'Meagher's country of Ikerrin, by some of the gentlemen of the Butlers. This was accordingly done in the month of June.

See also
House of Burke
Earl of Clanricarde

References

External links
 http://www.ucc.ie/celt/online/T100005F/text013.html

People from County Galway
16th-century Irish people
John Oge
People of Elizabethan Ireland
16th-century births
1601 deaths